Melaleuca thapsina is a plant in the myrtle family, Myrtaceae and is endemic to the south-west of Western Australia. It is a prickly shrub with fibrous or papery bark, yellow to cream coloured flowers and tightly packed cylinders of fruiting capsules.

Description

The flowers are cream coloured to bright yellow and are arranged in heads on the ends of branches which continue to grow after flowering and sometimes also in the upper leaf axils. The outer surface of the floral cup (the hypanthium) is hairy and there are five bundles of stamens around the flower, each with 6 to 8 stamens.

Taxonomy and naming
The specific epithet (thapsina) is derived from the Ancient Greek word thapsinos meaning "yellow" referring to the colour of the flowers.

Distribution and habitat
This melaleuca occurs in and between the Lake King, Norseman, Ravensthorpe and Esperance districts in the Coolgardie, Esperance Plains and Mallee biogeographic regions. It grows in a range of vegetation associations in sand and clay.

Conservation
Melaleuca thapsina is listed as "not threatened" by the Government of Western Australia Department of Parks and Wildlife.

References

thapsina
Plants described in 1999
Endemic flora of Western Australia
Taxa named by Lyndley Craven